Sasun Nikoli Mikayelyan (born 7 November 1957) is an Armenian politician and current member of the Armenian National Assembly. He is a founding member of the Civil Contract Party.
During the 2020 Nagorno-Karabakh conflict he was injured in the frontline by shrapnel in the legs.

References

Living people
1957 births
Armenian military personnel of the 2020 Nagorno-Karabakh war